Marmontel is a surname. Notable people with the surname include:

 Jean-François Marmontel (1723–1799), French literary figure
 Antoine François Marmontel (1816–1898), French pianist and musicographer